The men's mass start in the 2014–15 ISU Speed Skating World Cup was contested over six races on six occasions, out of a total of seven World Cup occasions for the season, with the first occasion taking place in Obihiro, Japan, on 14–16 November 2014, and the final occasion taking place in Erfurt, Germany, on 21–22 March 2015. The races were over 16 laps.

The defending champion was Bob de Vries of the Netherlands. Lee Seung-hoon of South Korea won the cup. De Vries did not participate this season.

Top three

Race medallists 

Note: in mass start, race points are accumulated during the race. The skater with most race points is the winner.

Standings 
Standings as of 22 March 2015 (end of the season).

References 

 
Men mass start